AC/DC (stylised as ACϟDC) are an Australian rock band formed in Sydney in 1973 by Scottish-born Australian brothers Malcolm (rhythm guitar) and Angus Young (lead guitar). Their music has been variously described as hard rock, blues rock, and heavy metal, but the band calls it simply "rock and roll".

AC/DC underwent several line-up changes before releasing their first album, High Voltage (1975). Membership subsequently stabilised around the Young brothers with fellow Scottish-born Australian Bon Scott (lead vocals) alongside native Australians Mark Evans (bass) and Phil Rudd (drums). Evans was fired from the band in 1977 and replaced by Cliff Williams, who has since appeared on every album since Powerage (1978). Seven months after the release of the band's breakthrough album Highway to Hell (1979), Scott died of alcohol poisoning and the other members considered disbanding. However, at the request of Scott's parents, they continued together and recruited English singer Brian Johnson as their new frontman. Their first album with Johnson, Back in Black (1980), was dedicated to Scott's memory. It was a widespread success, launching the band to new heights and becoming the second best-selling album of all time.

The band's eighth studio album, For Those About to Rock (1981), was their first album to reach number one in the United States. Prior to the release of their next album, Flick of the Switch (1983), Rudd left the band and was replaced by Simon Wright, who was himself replaced by Chris Slade six years later. The band experienced a commercial resurgence in the early 1990s with the release of their 12th studio album The Razors Edge (1990); it was their only album to feature Slade, who was replaced by the returning Rudd in 1994. Rudd has since recorded five more albums with the band, starting with Ballbreaker (1995). Their 15th studio album Black Ice was the second-highest-selling album of 2008 and their biggest chart hit since For Those About to Rock, eventually reaching No. 1 worldwide.

The band's line-up remained the same for 20 years until 2014, when Malcolm Young retired due to early-onset dementia (from which he died three years later) and Rudd became involved in legal troubles. Malcolm was replaced by his nephew Stevie Young, who debuted on the album Rock or Bust (2014). On the accompanying tour, previous drummer Chris Slade filled in for Rudd. In 2016, Johnson was advised to stop touring due to worsening hearing loss, and Guns N' Roses singer Axl Rose stepped in as the band's frontman for the remainder of that year's dates. Long-time bassist and backing vocalist Williams retired at the end of the Rock or Bust tour in 2016, and the group entered a four-year hiatus. A reunion of the Rock or Bust line-up was announced in September 2020, and the band's 17th studio album Power Up was released two months later.

AC/DC have sold more than 200 million records worldwide, including 75 million albums in the United States, making them the ninth-highest-selling artist in the United States and the 16th-best-selling artist worldwide. Back in Black has sold an estimated 50 million units worldwide, making it the second best-selling album of all time and the highest-selling album by a band. The album has sold 25 million units in the US, where it is the fourth best-selling album of all time. AC/DC were inducted into the Rock and Roll Hall of Fame in 2003. They ranked fourth on VH1 list of the "100 Greatest Artists of Hard Rock" and were named the seventh "Greatest Heavy Metal Band of All Time" by MTV. In 2004, they ranked No. 72 on the Rolling Stone list of the "100 Greatest Artists of All Time". American record producer Rick Rubin, who wrote an essay on the band for Rolling Stone, called them the "greatest rock and roll band of all time". In 2010, VH1 ranked them No. 23 on its list of the "100 Greatest Artists of All Time".

History

Formation and name (1973–1974)
In November 1973, Malcolm and Angus Young formed AC/DC with bassist Larry Van Kriedt, vocalist Dave Evans, and ex-Masters Apprentices drummer Colin Burgess. Gene Pierson booked the band to play at Chequers nightclub on New Year's Eve, 1973. By this time, Angus Young had adopted his characteristic school-uniform stage outfit. The idea was his sister Margaret's. Angus had tried other costumes: Spider-Man, Zorro, a gorilla, and a parody of Superman, named Super-Ang. In its early days, most members of the band dressed in some form of glam or satin outfit. On stage, Evans was occasionally replaced by the band's first manager, Dennis Laughlin, who was the original lead singer with Sherbet. In Paul Stenning's book AC/DC: Two Sides To Every Glory it was stated that Evans did not get along with Laughlin, which also contributed to the band's bitter feeling toward Evans.

Malcolm and Angus Young developed the idea for the band's name after their sister, Margaret Young, saw the initials "AC/DC" on the AC adapter of a sewing machine. "AC/DC" is an abbreviation meaning "alternating current/direct current" electricity. The brothers felt that this name symbolised the band's raw energy, power-driven performances of their music. "AC/DC" is pronounced one letter at a time, though the band are colloquially known as "Acca Dacca" in Australia. The AC/DC band name is stylised with a high voltage sign separating the "AC" and "DC" and has been used on all studio albums, with the exception of the international version of Dirty Deeds Done Dirt Cheap.

By the middle of 1974, the band had built up a strong live reputation, which led to a support slot for the visiting Lou Reed. Sometime in 1974, on the recommendation of Michael Chugg, veteran Melbourne promoter Michael Browning booked the band to play at his club, the Hard Rock. He was not pleased with their glam rock image and felt that Evans was the wrong singer for the band, but was impressed by the Young brothers' guitar playing. Shortly afterward, he received a call from the band; Laughlin had quit as manager, and they were stuck in Adelaide with no money. Browning agreed to bail them out and booked them for another gig at the Hard Rock. Following the gig, they agreed to take him on as their new manager, with the co-operation of their older brother George and Harry Vanda. The Young brothers decided to abandon the glam rock image which had already been adopted by Melbourne band Skyhooks and pursue a harder blues-rock sound. To this end, they agreed that Evans was not a suitable frontman for the group. Around this time, they also moved their base to Melbourne, where they frequently played at the Hard Rock.

Bon Scott era (1974–1980)

Beginnings (1974–1976)
In September 1974, Bon Scott, an experienced vocalist from Fraternity and friend of George Young, replaced Dave Evans after friend Vince Lovegrove recommended him to George Young. Scott's appointment coincided with him working as a chauffeur for the band at the time until an audition promoted him to lead singer. Like the Young brothers, Scott was born in Scotland and emigrated to Australia in his childhood. The band had recorded only one single with Evans, "Can I Sit Next to You, Girl" / "Rockin' in the Parlour"; the song was re-written and re-recorded with Bon Scott.

By October 1974, AC/DC had recorded their first studio album, High Voltage. It was released exclusively in Australia on 17 February 1975, along with a single "Baby, Please Don't Go" / "Love Song". The album took only ten days and was based on instrumental songs written by the Young brothers, with lyrics added by Scott. Within a few months, the band's line-up had stabilised, featuring Scott, the Young brothers, bassist Mark Evans, and drummer Phil Rudd. Later that year they released the single "It's a Long Way to the Top", for which a well-known promotional video was made for the program Countdown, featuring the band miming the song on the back of a flatbed truck. AC/DC released their second studio album, T.N.T., on 1 December 1975, which was also released only in Australia and New Zealand.

AC/DC were scheduled to play at the 1975 Sunbury music festival; however, they went home without performing following an altercation with the management and crew of headlining act Deep Purple.

Between 1974 and 1977, aided by regular appearances on Molly Meldrum's Countdown, the ABC's nationally broadcast pop-music television show, AC/DC became one of the most popular and successful acts in Australia. Their performance on 3 April 1977 was their last live TV appearance for more than 20 years.

Initial success, record deal (1976–1977)

Browning sent promo material to contacts in London, which came to the attention of Phil Carson of Atlantic Records. In 1976, the band signed an international deal with Atlantic Records. On arrival in London, their scheduled tour with Back Street Crawler was cancelled following the death of Paul Kossoff. As a result, they went back to playing smaller venues to build a local following until their label organised the "Lock Up Your Daughters" tour sponsored by Sounds magazine, the only major music magazine which was still relatively receptive to traditional rock music. At the time, punk rock was breaking and came to dominate the pages of the major British music weeklies, NME and Melody Maker. AC/DC were sometimes identified with the punk rock movement by the British press, but the band hated punk rock, believing it to be a passing fad—manager Michael Browning wrote that "it wasn't possible to even hold a conversation with AC/DC about punk without them getting totally pissed off". Their reputation managed to survive the punk upheavals and they maintained a cult following in the UK throughout this time. Angus Young gained notoriety for mooning the audience during live performances.

The first AC/DC album to gain worldwide distribution was a 1976 compilation of tracks taken from the High Voltage and T.N.T. LPs. Also titled High Voltage, and released on the Atlantic Records label, the album has to date sold three million copies worldwide. The track selection was heavily weighted toward the more recent T.N.T., including only two songs from their first LP. The band's third studio album, Dirty Deeds Done Dirt Cheap, was released in the same year in both Australian and international versions, like its predecessor. Track listings varied worldwide, and the international version of the album also featured the T.N.T. track "Rocker", which had previously not been released internationally. The original Australian version included "Jailbreak" (now more readily available on the 1984 compilation EP '74 Jailbreak or as a live version on the 1992 Live album). Dirty Deeds was not released in the US until 1981, by which time the band were at the peak of their popularity.

After a brief tour of Sweden, they returned to London where they set new attendance records during their residency at the Marquee. However, their appearance at the 1976 Reading Festival failed to get a response from the crowd. They toured extensively throughout Europe, then returned to tour Australia in late 1976 to rebuild their finances and record their fourth studio album, Let There Be Rock.

In early 1977, they returned to Britain and began a European tour with Black Sabbath. While Bon Scott and Ozzy Osbourne quickly became friends, relations were less than cordial between the other members of the respective bands. In one incident, Geezer Butler pulled a "knife" on Malcolm Young, though it was a "silly" flick-knife comb. Later in the year they toured with Rainbow.

Cliff Williams joins, death of Bon Scott (1977–1980)
Towards the end of 1977, bassist Mark Evans was dismissed. Evans described disagreement with Angus and Malcolm as a contributing factor. He was replaced by Cliff Williams, an experienced bass player who had played with several UK bands since the late 60s. Neither of the Young brothers has elaborated on the departure of Evans, though Richard Griffiths, the CEO of Epic Records and a booking agent for AC/DC in the mid-1970s, later commented, "You knew Mark wasn't going to last, he was just too much of a nice guy." Mark Evans' autobiography, Dirty Deeds: My Life Inside/Outside of AC/DC, released in 2011, predominantly dealt with his time in AC/DC, including being fired.

AC/DC's first American radio exposure was through Bill Bartlett at Jacksonville station WPDQ/WAIV in 1975, two years before they played their first US concert as support band for Canadian group Moxy in Austin, Texas, on 27 July 1977. Under the guidance of booking agent Doug Thaler of American Talent International and later the management of Leber-Krebs, they gained invaluable experience of the US stadium circuit, supporting leading rock acts such as Ted Nugent, Aerosmith, Kiss, Styx, UFO, and Blue Öyster Cult, and co-headlined with bands such as Cheap Trick.

AC/DC released their fifth studio album, Powerage, on 5 May 1978, and with its harder riffs, followed the blueprint set by Let There Be Rock. Only one single was released from Powerage, "Rock 'n' Roll Damnation/Sin City". An appearance at the Apollo Theatre, Glasgow during the Powerage tour was recorded and released as If You Want Blood You've Got It.

The major breakthrough in the band's career came in their collaboration with producer "Mutt" Lange on the band's sixth studio album Highway to Hell, released in 1979. Eddie Van Halen notes this to be his favourite AC/DC record, along with Powerage. It became the first AC/DC LP to break into the US top 100, eventually reaching No. 17, and it propelled AC/DC into the top ranks of hard rock acts. Highway to Hell had lyrics that shifted away from flippant and comical toward more central rock themes, putting increased emphasis on backing vocals but still featured AC/DC's signature sound: loud, simple, pounding riffs and grooving backbeats.

In 1980, the band began to work on their seventh studio album Back in Black before tragedy struck. On 19 February 1980, Scott purportedly passed out in the car on the way back to the apartment of an acquaintance called Alistair Kinnear after a night of drinking and alleged drug-taking at The Music Machine in Camden, London. According to Kinnear, upon arrival at his home, he was unable to move Scott from the car into his home for the night, so he left him in the car overnight to sleep off the effects of the alcohol. Unable to wake Scott early on the evening of 20 February 1980, Kinnear rushed him to King's College Hospital in Camberwell, where Scott was pronounced dead on arrival. Pulmonary aspiration of vomit was cited as the cause of Scott's death, and the official cause was listed as "acute alcohol poisoning". Scott's family buried him in Fremantle, Western Australia, the area they emigrated to when he was a boy.

Brian Johnson era (1980–present)

Rebirth (1980–1983)

Following Scott's death, the band briefly considered quitting, but encouraged by the insistence from Scott's parents that he would have wanted them to carry on, they decided to continue, and went about finding a new vocalist. Allan Fryer of Fat Lip, ex-Rick Wakeman vocalist Gary Pickford-Hopkins, and the Easybeats' singer Stevie Wright were touted by the press as possible replacements. Various other candidates were also considered, including ex-Moxy member Buzz Shearman, who was not able to join because of voice issues, Slade vocalist Noddy Holder, and ex-Back Street Crawler vocalist Terry Slesser.

At the advice of Lange, the group brought in ex-Geordie singer Brian Johnson, who impressed the group. For the audition, Johnson sang "Whole Lotta Rosie" from Let There Be Rock and Ike & Tina Turner's "Nutbush City Limits". After the band begrudgingly worked through the rest of the list of applicants in the following days, Johnson returned for a second rehearsal.

Angus Young later recalled, "I remember the first time I had ever heard Brian's (Johnson) name was from Bon. Bon had mentioned that he had been in England once touring with a band and he had mentioned that Brian had been in a band called Geordie and Bon had said 'Brian Johnson, he was a great rock and roll singer in the style of Little Richard.' And that was Bon's big idol, Little Richard. I think when he saw Brian at that time, to Bon it was 'Well he's a guy that knows what rock and roll is all about.' He mentioned that to us in Australia. I suppose when we decided to continue, Brian was the first name that Malcolm and myself came up with, so we said we should see if we can find him."

On 29 March, Malcolm Young called the singer to offer him a place in the band, much to Johnson's surprise. Out of respect for Bon Scott, the band wanted a vocalist who would not be a mere imitator of him. In addition to his distinctive voice, demeanor and love of classic soul and blues music, the group was impressed by Johnson's engaging personality. Johnson was officially announced as the new lead singer of AC/DC on 1 April 1980.

With Johnson as the new vocalist, the band completed the songwriting that they had begun with Scott for the album Back in Black. Recording took place at Compass Point Studios in The Bahamas a few months after Scott's death. Back in Black, produced by Mutt Lange and recorded by Tony Platt, became their biggest-selling album and a hard-rock landmark; hits include "Hells Bells", "You Shook Me All Night Long", "Rock and Roll Ain't Noise Pollution" and the title track. The album reached No.1 in the UK and No.4 in the US, where it spent 131 weeks on the Billboard 200 album chart.

The band's eighth studio album, For Those About to Rock We Salute You, was released in 1981, also sold well and was positively received by critics. The album featured two of the band's most popular singles: "Let's Get It Up" and the title track, "For Those About to Rock", which reached No.13 and No.15 in the UK, respectively.

Lineup changes and commercial decline (1983–1989)
The band parted ways with producer Mutt Lange for their ninth studio album, Flick of the Switch, released in 1983, in an effort to recover the rawness and simplicity of their early albums, but it was considered underdeveloped and unmemorable; one critic stated that the band "had made the same album nine times". AC/DC were voted the eighth-biggest disappointment of the year in the 1984 Kerrang! readers' poll. However, Flick of the Switch eventually reached No. 4 on the UK charts, and AC/DC had minor success with the singles "Nervous Shakedown" and "Flick of the Switch".

After having problems with drugs and alcohol, drummer Phil Rudd's friendship with Malcolm Young deteriorated and eventually escalated to a physical confrontation after which Rudd was fired halfway through the Flick of the Switch sessions. Former Procol Harum drummer B.J. Wilson was drafted in to help complete the recordings, but his drum parts were eventually not used, as Rudd had already completed the drum parts. Rudd was replaced by Simon Wright in the summer of 1983 after the band held over 700 auditions in the US and UK. Simon Kirke of Free and Bad Company fame, and Paul Thompson of Roxy Music were two of the drummers auditioned.

The band's tenth studio album, Fly on the Wall, produced by the Young brothers in 1985, was also regarded as uninspired and directionless. A music concept video of the same name featured the band at a bar, playing five of the album's ten songs.

In 1986, the group returned to the charts with the made-for-radio "Who Made Who". The album Who Made Who was the soundtrack to Stephen King's film Maximum Overdrive; it brought together older hits, such as "You Shook Me All Night Long", with newer songs such as title track and two new instrumentals, "D.T." and "Chase the Ace".

In February 1988, AC/DC were inducted into the Australian Recording Industry Association's Hall of Fame. AC/DC's eleventh studio album, Blow Up Your Video, released in 1988, was recorded at Studio Miraval in Le Val, France, and reunited the band with their original producers, Harry Vanda and George Young. The group recorded nineteen songs, choosing ten for the final release; though the album was later criticised for containing excessive "filler", it was a commercial success. Blow Up Your Video sold more copies than the previous two studio releases combined, reaching No. 2 on the UK charts—AC/DC's highest position since "Back in Black" in 1980. The album featured the UK top-twenty single "Heatseeker" and popular songs such as "That's the Way I Wanna Rock 'n' Roll". The Blow Up Your Video World Tour began in February 1988, in Perth, Australia. That April, following live appearances across Europe, Malcolm Young announced that he was taking time off from touring, principally to begin recovery from his alcoholism. Another member of the Young family, Stevie Young, temporarily took Malcolm's place.

In 1989, Wright left the group to work on the upcoming Dio album Lock Up the Wolves, and was replaced by session veteran Chris Slade. Johnson was unavailable for several months while finalising his divorce, so the Young brothers wrote all the songs for the next album, a practice they continued for all subsequent releases through Rock or Bust in 2014.

Popularity regained (1990–1998)
The band's twelfth studio album, The Razors Edge, was recorded in Vancouver, British Columbia, Canada, and was mixed and engineered by Mike Fraser and produced by Bruce Fairbairn, who had previously worked with Aerosmith and Bon Jovi. Released in 1990, it was a major success for the band, and included the hits "Thunderstruck" and "Are You Ready", which reached No. 5 and No. 16 respectively on Billboard's Mainstream Rock Tracks Chart, and "Moneytalks", which peaked at No. 23 on the  Billboard Hot 100. The album went multi-platinum and reached the US top ten. In September 1991, 1.6  million people attended the Monsters of Rock festival in Moscow to enjoy the first open-air rock concert to be held in the former Soviet Union. The show, also featuring Pantera, The Black Crowes and Metallica, had one of the largest attendances ever for a musical event.

Several shows on the Razors Edge tour were recorded for the 1992 live album, titled Live. Live was produced by Fairbairn, and has been called one of the best live albums of the 1990s. AC/DC headlined the Monsters of Rock show during this tour, which was released on DVD as Live at Donington. During The Razors Edge tour, three fans were killed at a concert at the Salt Palace in Salt Lake City, Utah in January 1991: when the concert began fans rushed the stage crushing the three and injuring others. It took 20 minutes before venue security and the group understood the severity of the situation and halted the concert. AC/DC settled with the victims' families out of court. As a result of this incident, the Salt Palace eliminated festival seating from future events.

In 1993, AC/DC recorded "Big Gun" for the soundtrack of the Arnold Schwarzenegger movie Last Action Hero. Released as a single, the song reached No. 1 on the US Mainstream Rock chart—the band's first No. 1 single on that chart.

In 1994, Pacific Gameworks created a proposal for a beat 'em up video game project intended for the Atari Jaguar CD titled AC/DC: Defenders of Metal, which would have prominently featured the AC/DC crew, however, production of the game never started and it was left unreleased.

In 1994, Angus and Malcolm invited Rudd to several jam sessions. He was eventually rehired to replace Slade, whose departure arose in part because of the band's strong desire to again work with Rudd. Recorded at the Ocean Way Studios in Los Angeles by the reunited 1980–83 line-up and produced by Rick Rubin, the band's thirteenth studio album, Ballbreaker was released in 1995. The first single from the album was "Hard as a Rock". Two more singles were released from the album: "Hail Caesar" and "Cover You in Oil".

In 1997, a box set named Bonfire was released. It contained four albums; a remastered version of Back in Black; Volts (a disc with alternative takes, outtakes, and stray live cuts) and two live albums, Live from the Atlantic Studios and Let There Be Rock: The Movie. Live from the Atlantic Studios was recorded on 7 December 1977 at the Atlantic Studios in New York. Let There Be Rock: The Movie was a double album recorded in 1979 at the Pavillon de Paris and was the soundtrack of a motion picture, AC/DC: Let There Be Rock. The US version of the box set included a colour booklet, a two-sided poster, a sticker, a temporary tattoo, a keychain bottle opener, and a guitar pick.

Popularity confirmed (1999–2013)
In 1999, AC/DC recorded their fourteenth studio album, Stiff Upper Lip, produced by brother George Young at the Warehouse Studio, again in Vancouver. Released in February 2000, the album was better received by critics than Ballbreaker but was considered lacking in new ideas. The Australian release included a bonus disc with three promotional videos and several live performances recorded in Madrid, Spain in 1996. Stiff Upper Lip reached No.1 in five countries, including Argentina and Germany; No.2 in three countries, Spain, France and Switzerland; No.3 in Australia; No.5 in Canada and Portugal; and No.7 in Norway, the US and Hungary. The first single, "Stiff Upper Lip", remained at No.1 on the US Mainstream Rock charts for four weeks. The band also performed that song live when they appeared as the musical guest on Saturday Night Live in March 2000. The other singles released also charted – "Satellite Blues" and "Safe in New York City" reached No.7 and No.31 on Billboard's Mainstream Rock Tracks.

In 2002, AC/DC signed a long-term, multi-album deal with Sony Music, who went on to release a series of remastered albums as part of their AC/DC remasters series. Each release contained an expanded booklet featuring rare photographs, memorabilia, and notes. In 2003, the entire back-catalogue (except Ballbreaker and Stiff Upper Lip) was remastered and re-released. Ballbreaker and Stiff Upper Lip was later re-released in 2004. Also in 2003, the band was inducted into the Rock and Roll Hall of Fame.

On 30 July 2003, the band performed with the Rolling Stones and Rush at Molson Canadian Rocks for Toronto. The concert, held before an audience of half a million, was intended to help the city overcome the negative publicity stemming from the effects of a 2003 SARS epidemic. The concert holds the record for the largest paid music event in North American history. The band came second in a list of Australia's highest-earning entertainers for 2005, and sixth for 2006, despite having neither toured since 2003 nor released an album since 2000. Verizon Wireless has gained the rights to release AC/DC's full albums and the entire Live at Donington concert to download in 2008.

On 16 October 2007, Columbia Records released a double and triple DVD titled Plug Me In. The set consists of five and seven hours of rare footage, and even a recording of AC/DC at a high school performing "School Days", "TNT", "She's Got Balls", and "It's a Long Way to the Top". As with Family Jewels, disc one contains rare shows of the band with Bon Scott, and disc two is about the Brian Johnson era. The collector's edition contains an extra DVD with 21 more rare performances of both Scott and Johnson and more interviews.

AC/DC made their video game debut on Rock Band 2, with "Let There Be Rock" included as a playable track. The setlist from their Live at Donington live album was released as playable songs for the Rock Band series by means of a Wal-Mart-exclusive retail disc titled AC/DC Live: Rock Band Track Pack.

No Bull: The Directors Cut, a newly edited, comprehensive Blu-ray and DVD of the band's July 1996 Plaza De Toros de las Ventas concert in Madrid, Spain, was released on 9 September 2008.

On 18 August 2008, Columbia Records announced the 18 October Australian release, and 20 October worldwide release, of their fifteenth studio album, Black Ice. The 15-track album was the band's first studio release in eight years, was produced by Brendan O'Brien and was mixed and engineered by Mike Fraser. Like Stiff Upper Lip, it was recorded at The Warehouse Studio in Vancouver, British Columbia. Black Ice was sold in the US exclusively at Walmart and Sam's Club and the band's official website.

"Rock 'n' Roll Train", the album's first single, was released to radio on 28 August. On 15 August, AC/DC recorded a video for a song from the new album in London with a special selection of fans getting the chance to be in the video. Black Ice debuted at No.1 on album charts in 29 countries and also was Columbia Records' biggest debut album (since Nielsen SoundScan began tracking sales data for Billboard in March 1991). Black Ice has been certified Multi Platinum in eight countries, including the US, Australia, Canada, Switzerland, Sweden, Norway, Germany, and the Czech Republic. Additionally, Black Ice has achieved Platinum status in twelve countries (Austria, Belgium, Denmark, Finland, France, Hungary, Ireland, Italy, UK, Argentina, Singapore, and New Zealand) and Gold status in four countries (Netherlands, Spain, Poland, and Brazil). The 18-month Black Ice World Tour supporting the new album was announced on 11 September and began on 28 October in Wilkes-Barre, Pennsylvania.

On 15 September 2008, AC/DC Radio debuted on Sirius Channel 19 and XM channel 53. The channel plays AC/DC music along with interviews with the band members.

With the North American release of Black Ice on 20 October 2008, Columbia Records and Walmart created "Rock Again AC/DC Stores" to promote the album. In October 2008, MTV, Walmart, and Columbia created "AC/DC Rock Band Stores" in New York City, at Times Square, and in Los Angeles. "Black Ice" trucks were also dispatched on the streets of these two cities after the release, playing AC/DC music aloud and making various stops each day to sell merchandise.

In late September 2009, the band rescheduled six shows when Brian Johnson underwent an operation for ulcers. On 29 September, the band announced a collection of studio and live rarities, Backtracks, which was released on 10 November 2009 as a 3-CD/2-DVD/1-LP box-set.

On 4 November, AC/DC were announced as the Business Review Weekly top Australian earner (entertainment) for 2009 with earnings of $105 million. This displaced The Wiggles from the number one spot for the first time in four years.

On 19 April 2010, AC/DC released Iron Man 2, the soundtrack for the eponymous film which compiled earlier tracks from the band's studio albums. One month later, the band headlined Download Festival at Donington Park, and closed the Black Ice World Tour in Bilbao, Spain on 28 June 2010, after 20 months in which AC/DC went to 108 cities in over 28 countries, with an estimated audience of over five million people. Three concerts in December 2009 at the River Plate Stadium in Argentina were released as the DVD Live at River Plate on 10 May 2011. An exclusive single from the DVD, featuring the songs "Shoot to Thrill" and "War Machine", was issued on Record Store Day. In 2011, the band also issued on DVD and Blu-ray the concert movie AC/DC: Let There Be Rock, which had its theatrical release in 1980.

On 19 November 2012, AC/DC released Live at River Plate, their first live album in 20 years.

Multiple line-up changes and hiatus (2014–2018)
On 16 April 2014, in response to earlier reports that the band may be disbanding due to Malcolm Young's illness, Brian Johnson commented that AC/DC were not completely disbanding, stating "We are definitely getting together in May in Vancouver. We're going to pick up guitars, have a plonk and see if anybody has got any tunes or ideas. If anything happens we'll record it." In July 2014, AC/DC announced that they had finished recording their next album and that Malcolm's nephew, Stevie Young, replaced Malcolm in the studio. On 23 September 2014, Alberts Management confirmed that Malcolm had officially departed from the band. Malcolm's last show with the band was on 28 June 2010 in Bilbao, Spain; he died on 18 November 2017 at the age of 64.

Drummer Phil Rudd released his first solo album, Head Job, on 29 August 2014. He confirmed that there would be another AC/DC tour, and stated that the band had no intention of retiring. On 23 September 2014, Alberts Management revealed that the band's sixteenth studio album, Rock or Bust, featuring eleven new tracks, would be released on 28 November 2014 as the first AC/DC album in the band's history without Malcolm Young on the recordings. The band also announced plans for a world tour to promote the new album with Malcolm and Angus' nephew Stevie Young as Malcolm's replacement.

On 6 November 2014, Rudd was charged with attempting to procure a murder, threatening to kill, possession of methamphetamine, and possession of cannabis, following a police raid on his home. The charge of attempting to procure a murder was withdrawn the following day, but the other charges remained. AC/DC released a statement clarifying that the tour promoting Rock or Bust would continue, but did not say whether or not Rudd would participate, or if he was still a member of the band.

At the charity signing before the Grammy Awards, the band was photographed together with former drummer Chris Slade. It was later confirmed that he had rejoined the band for the Grammys and upcoming tour. In April 2015, Rudd pleaded guilty to drug charges and threatening to kill a former assistant. Shortly thereafter, the band's web site removed Rudd as the band's drummer and replaced him with Slade. On 9 July 2015, Rudd was denied a discharge without conviction and sentenced to eight months of home detention.

On 7 March 2016, the band announced that the final ten dates of the Rock or Bust World Tour would be rescheduled as Johnson's doctors had ordered him to stop touring immediately, as his hearing loss had accelerated and he risked complete deafness if he persisted on the road. The ten cancelled dates would be performed "likely with a guest vocalist" later in the year, leaving Johnson's future in touring with the group uncertain. Johnson later stated on The Howard Stern Show that his hearing loss did not come from performing for 36 years with AC/DC, but rather his love of auto racing and having forgotten to put in ear plugs during one race that ruptured his left ear drum.

On 19 April 2016, Johnson made an official statement regarding his health problems and inability to tour. In the statement, he acknowledged his ongoing hearing difficulties but stated his intentions to continue recording and potentially resume touring if his health improves sufficiently. He also specifically thanked Angus Young and Cliff Williams for their support during his AC/DC tenure. His last show with AC/DC was on 28 February 2016; at the Sprint Center in Kansas City.

On 16 April 2016, AC/DC released a statement announcing the addition of Guns N' Roses frontman Axl Rose as the band's lead vocalist for the remainder of their 2016 tour dates. The statement read: "AC/DC band members would like to thank Brian Johnson for his contributions and dedication to the band throughout the years. We wish him all the best with his hearing issues and future ventures. As much as we want this tour to end as it started, we understand, respect and support Brian's decision to stop touring and save his hearing. We are dedicated to fulfilling the remainder of our touring commitments to everyone that has supported us over the years, and are fortunate that Axl Rose has kindly offered his support to help us fulfill this commitment. AC/DC will resume their Rock or Bust World Tour with Axl Rose joining on vocals."

On 8 July 2016, Cliff Williams indicated he was leaving the band in an interview with Gulfshore Life, saying "It's been what I've known for the past 40 years, but after this tour I'm backing off of touring and recording. Losing Malcolm, the thing with Phil and now with Brian, it's a changed animal. I feel in my gut it's the right thing." At the end of the Rock or Bust World Tour, he released a video statement confirming his departure. His final show with AC/DC was in Philadelphia on 20 September 2016.

After completing the Rock or Bust tour in 2016, AC/DC went on hiatus. Over the next few years, speculation began that former members Johnson and Rudd were back and working with the band again, after a fan living near The Warehouse Studio in Vancouver, B.C. claimed to have observed them in the outdoor area of the studio from her apartment window.

Reunion and Power Up (2018–present)
On 28 September 2020, AC/DC updated their social media accounts with a short video clip depicting an illumination of a neon light in the shape of the band's lightning bolt logo. This led to speculation that they were "preparing to announce its comeback, possibly as early as this week or next week." On the next day, the band's official website was redirected to pwrup.acdc.com, and updated with an AC/DC online store and a "Power Up" e-mail sign-up, leading to speculation that Power Up would be the title of the new album. This speculation was also fuelled by another teaser video from AC/DC, simply featuring the hashtag #PWRUP.

On 30 September 2020, AC/DC officially confirmed the return of Brian Johnson, Phil Rudd and Cliff Williams to the band, alongside Angus and Stevie Young reuniting the Rock or Bust recording line-up.

On 1 October 2020, AC/DC released a snippet of their new song "Shot in the Dark." Shortly thereafter, the band's official website published a few photographs of several different posters displayed in different cities (from different countries) – such as Ashfield (in front of Angus Young's Ashfield Boys High School), Lille, London and Dallas – featuring the writing "PWR/UP".

On 7 October 2020, the band confirmed the upcoming release on 13 November 2020 of their new studio album, Power Up, and released the first single taken from it, "Shot in the Dark". The album's track listing was revealed on their website via a spinning promotional album. Angus Young also noted that the new album, as was Rock or Bust, is dedicated to Malcolm Young, much in the same way that Back in Black was dedicated to Bon Scott.

Musical style
AC/DC have referred to themselves as "a rock and roll band, nothing more, nothing less". In the opinion of Stephen Thomas Erlewine of AllMusic, they are "one of the defining acts of '70s hard rock" and reactionary to the period's art rock and arena rock excesses: "AC/DC's rock was minimalist – no matter how huge and bludgeoning their guitar chords were, there was a clear sense of space and restraint." According to Alexis Petridis, their music is "hard-edged, wilfully basic blues-rock" featuring humorous sexual innuendo and lyrics about rock and roll. Music academic Robert McParland described the band's sound as being defined by the heavy rock guitar of the Young brothers, layered power chords, and forceful vocals. "For some, AC/DC are the ultimate heavy metal act", Tim Jonze wrote in The Guardian, "but for others, AC/DC aren't a heavy metal act at all, they're a classic rock band – and calling them heavy metal is an act of treachery." On the controversy of categorising their music, McParland wrote:

According to Vulture music journalist David Marchese, the instrumental foundation of the band's simple sound was the drummer—Rudd, Wright, or Slade—striking the kick drum on the first and third beat of every measure, and the snare drum on the second and fourth beat; bassist Williams consistently downpicking an eighth note; Angus Young performing lead parts that possessed "a clear architecture and even sort of swing, in a frenzied, half-demented way"; and Malcolm Young's "propulsive" yet nuanced rhythm guitar featuring "little chuks, stutters, and silences that give the monstrous riffs life". For the majority of Malcolm Young's tenure in AC/DC, he used a Marshall Super Bass head to amplify his rhythm guitar while recording in the studio. According to Chris Gill of Guitar World, the amplifier helped define his signature guitar tone: "clean but as loud as possible to ride on the razor's edge of power amp distortion and deliver the ideal combination of grind, twang, clang and crunch, with no distorted preamp 'hair,' fizz or compression", as heard on songs such as "Let There Be Rock", "Dirty Deeds", "For Those About to Rock", and "Thunderstruck". During 1978 to 1980, however, Young used a Marshall 2203 100-watt master volume head, which Gill speculates may have contributed to a "slightly more distorted and dark" guitar tone on the albums from that period, including Powerage and Back in Black.

With the recording of Back in Black in 1980, rock journalist Joe S. Harrington believed the band had departed further from the blues-oriented rock of their previous albums, and toward a more dynamic attack that adopted punk rock's "high-energy implications" and transmuted their hard rock/heavy metal songs into "more pop-oriented blasts". The band would remain faithful for the remainder of their career, to this "impeccably ham-handed" musical style: "the guitars were compacted into a singular statement of rhythmic efficiency, the rhythm section provided the thunderhorse overdrive, and vocalist Johnson belowed and brayed like the most unhinged practitioner of bluesy top-man dynamics since vintage Robert Plant."

In a comparison of AC/DC's vocalists, Robert Christgau said Bon Scott exhibited a "blokelike croak" and "charm", often singing about sexual aggression in the guise of fun: "Like Ian Hunter or Roger Chapman though without their panache, he has fun being a dirty young man". Johnson, in his opinion, possessed "three times the range and wattage" as a vocalist while projecting the character of a "bloke as fantasy-fiction demigod". By the time Johnson had fully acclimated himself with 1981's For Those About to Rock We Salute You, Christgau said he defined "an anthemic grandiosity more suitable to [the band's] precious-metal status than Bon Scott's old-fashioned raunch", albeit in a less intelligent manner.

Criticism
Throughout the band's career, their songs have been criticised as simplistic, monotonous, deliberately lowbrow, and sexist. David Marchese from Vulture wrote that, "regardless of the lyricist, whether it was Scott (who was capable of real wit and colour), Johnson, or the Young brothers, there's a deep strain of misogyny in the band's output that veers from feeling terribly dated to straight-up reprehensible." According to Christgau in 1988, "the brutal truth is that sexism has never kept a great rock-and-roller down—from Muddy to Lemmy, lots of dynamite music has objectified women in objectionable ways. But rotely is not among those ways", in regards to AC/DC. Fans of the band have defended their music by highlighting its "bawdy humour", while members of the group have generally been dismissive of claims that their songs are sexist, arguing that they are meant to be in jest. In an interview with Sylvie Simmons for Mojo, Angus called the band "pranksters more than anything else", while Malcolm said "we're not like some macho band. We take the music far more seriously than we take the lyrics, which are just throwaway lines." Marchese regarded the musical aspect of the Youngs' songs "strong enough to render the words a functional afterthought", as well as "deceptively plain, devastatingly effective, and extremely lucrative".

For the book Under My Thumb: Songs That Hate Women and the Women Who Love Them, The Guardian arts critic Fiona Sturges contributed an essay evaluating her love for AC/DC. While acknowledging she is a feminist, and that the band's music is problematic for her, she believed it would be "daft, as opposed to damaging", for female listeners if they can understand the band to be "a bunch of archly sex-obsessed idiots with sharp tunes and some seriously killer riffs". In spite of the "unpleasant sneering quality" of "Carry Me Home"s claims about a woman who "ain't no lady", the "rape fantasy" of "Let Me Put My Love into You", and the generally one-dimensional portrayals of women, Sturges said songs such as "Whole Lotta Rosie" and "You Shook Me All Night Long" demonstrated that the female characters "are also having a good time and are, more often than not, in the driving seat in sexual terms... it's the men who come over as passive and hopeless, awestruck in the presence of sexual partners more experienced and adept than them."

As with many bands of their era, AC/DC ran afoul of the Satanic panic of the 1980s. This general fear of modern hard rock and heavy metal was greatly increased in the band's case when serial killer Richard Ramirez was arrested. Ramirez, nicknamed the "Night Stalker" by the press, told police that "Night Prowler" from the 1979 Highway to Hell album had driven him to commit murder. Police also claimed that Ramirez was wearing an AC/DC shirt and left an AC/DC hat at one of the crime scenes. Accusations that AC/DC were devil worshippers were made, the lyrics of "Night Prowler" were analysed, and some newspapers attempted to link Ramirez's Satanism with AC/DC's name, arriving at the conclusion that AC/DC actually stood for Anti-Christ/Devil's Child (or Devil's Children).

Accolades
AC/DC were a somewhat formative influence on the new wave of British heavy metal bands who emerged in the late 1970s, such as Saxon and Iron Maiden, in part as a reaction to the decline of traditional early 1970s hard rock bands. In 2007, critics noted that AC/DC, along with Thin Lizzy, UFO, Scorpions, and Judas Priest, were among "the second generation of rising stars ready to step into the breach as the old guard waned."

AC/DC were inducted into the Rock and Roll Hall of Fame on 10 March 2003. During the ceremony the band performed "Highway to Hell" and "You Shook Me All Night Long", with guest vocals provided by host Steven Tyler of Aerosmith. He described the band's power chords as "the thunder from down under that gives you the second most powerful surge that can flow through your body." During the acceptance speech, Brian Johnson quoted their 1977 song "Let There Be Rock".

On 22 March 2000, the municipality of Leganés (near Madrid) named a street in honour of the band as "Calle de AC/DC" ("AC/DC Street"). Malcolm and Angus attended the inauguration with many fans. Later that day, the plaque with the name of the group was stolen, perhaps by an enthusiast or collector. The plaque was replaced two hours later, and stolen once again a mere three days after the fact. The plaque had since been stolen numerous times, forcing the municipality of Leganés to begin selling replicas of the official street plaque.

In 2003, Rolling Stones 500 Greatest Albums of All Time list included Back in Black at number 73, and Highway to Hell at number 199. And in 2004, on their 500 Greatest Songs of All Time list, Rolling Stone included "Back in Black" at number 187, and "Highway to Hell" at number 254.

In May 2003, the Young brothers accepted a Ted Albert Award for Outstanding Service to Australian Music at the 2003 Music Winners Awards, during which Malcolm paid special tribute to Bon Scott, who was also a recipient of the award.

On 1 October 2004, a central Melbourne thoroughfare, Corporation Lane, was renamed ACDC Lane in honour of the band. The City of Melbourne forbade the use of the slash character in street names, so the four letters were combined. The lane is near Swanston Street where, on the back of a truck, the band recorded their video for the 1975 hit "It's a Long Way to the Top".

They sold over 1.3 million CDs in the US during 2007 despite not having released a new album since 2000 at that point. Additionally, the group's commercial success continues to flourish despite their choice to refrain from selling albums in digital online formats for many years. However, in November 2012, the entire catalogue (excluding the TNT album and the Australian versions of the High Voltage, Dirty Deeds Done Dirt Cheap and Let There Be Rock albums) became available on the iTunes Store.

In 2009, the Recording Industry Association of America (RIAA) upgraded the group's US sales figures from 69 million to 71 million, making AC/DC the fifth-best-selling band in US history and the tenth-best-selling artist, selling more albums than Madonna and Mariah Carey. The RIAA also certified Back in Black as double Diamond (20 million) in US sales, and by 2007 the album had sold 25 million copies, which made it the fourth-best-selling album of all-time in the US.

Band members

Current members
 Angus Young – lead guitar, occasional backing vocals (1973–present)
 Phil Rudd – drums (1975–1983, 1994–2015, 2018–present)
 Cliff Williams – bass, backing vocals (1977–2016, 2018–present)
 Brian Johnson – lead vocals (1980–2016, 2018–present)
 Stevie Young – rhythm guitar, backing vocals (2014–present;

Former members
 Malcolm Young – rhythm guitar, backing vocals (1973–2014; 
 Dave Evans – lead vocals (1973–1974)
 Larry Van Kriedt – bass, saxophone (1973–1974)
 Colin Burgess – drums (1973–1974)
 Neil Smith – bass (1974)
 Ron Carpenter – drums (1974)
 Russell Coleman – drums (1974)
 Noel Taylor – drums (1974)
 Rob Bailey – bass (1974–1975)
 Peter Clack – drums (1974–1975)
 Bon Scott – lead vocals (1974–1980; 
 Paul Matters – bass (1975; 
 Mark Evans – bass (1975–1977)
 Simon Wright – drums (1983–1989)
 Chris Slade – drums (1989–1994, 2015–2016)
 Axl Rose – lead vocals (2016)

Awards and nominations

Discography

 High Voltage (1975) 
 T.N.T. (1975) 
 High Voltage (1976) 
 Dirty Deeds Done Dirt Cheap (1976)
 Let There Be Rock (1977)
 Powerage (1978)
 Highway to Hell (1979)
 Back in Black (1980)
 For Those About to Rock We Salute You (1981)
 Flick of the Switch (1983)
 Fly on the Wall (1985)
 Blow Up Your Video (1988)
 The Razors Edge (1990)
 Ballbreaker (1995)
 Stiff Upper Lip (2000)
 Black Ice (2008)
 Rock or Bust (2014)
 Power Up (2020)

Tours

Headlining
 Australian Clubs Tour (1973–1975)
 High Voltage Tour (1975) 
 T.N.T. Tour (1975–1976) 
 High Voltage Tour (1976) 
 Dirty Deeds Done Dirt Cheap Tour (1976–1977)
 Let There Be Rock Tour (1977)
 Powerage Tour (1978)
 If You Want Blood, You've Got It Tour (1978–1979)
 Highway to Hell Tour (1979–1980)
 Back in Black Tour (1980–1981)
 For Those About to Rock Tour (1981–1982)
 Flick of the Switch Tour (1983–1985)
 Fly on the Wall Tour (1985–1986)
 Who Made Who Tour (1986)
 Blow Up Your Video World Tour (1988)
 Razors Edge World Tour (1990–1991)
 Ballbreaker World Tour (1996)
 Stiff Upper Lip World Tour (2000–2001)
 Black Ice World Tour (2008–2010)
 Rock or Bust World Tour (2015–2016)

Opening acts

 The Rolling Stones – Licks Tour (2003)

See also
 AC/DShe – an all-female tribute band who covers Bon Scott-era material
 Hell's Belles – another all-female tribute band
 Hayseed Dixie – a parody band performing bluegrass-inspired renditions of songs by AC/DC and others

References

Further reading

External links

 
 
 

 
1973 establishments in Australia
APRA Award winners
ARIA Award winners
ARIA Hall of Fame inductees
Albert Productions artists
Atlantic Records artists
Atco Records artists
EMI Records artists
East West Records artists
Elektra Records artists
Epic Records artists
Columbia Records artists
Sony Music Australia artists
Australian hard rock musical groups
Australian heavy metal musical groups
Australian blues rock groups
Echo (music award) winners
Grammy Award winners
Musical groups established in 1973
Musical groups from Sydney
Musical quintets
Sibling musical groups